Arthur Balfour, 1st Baron Riverdale  (9 January 1873 – 7 July 1957), known as Sir Arthur Balfour from 1923 to 1929 and Sir Arthur Balfour, 1st Baronet, from 1929 to 1935, was a British steel manufacturer.

Balfour was the son of Herbert Balfour. He was Chairman of Arthur Balfour & Co Ltd and of C Meadows & Co Ltd, both of Sheffield, Yorkshire, and also served as President of the Association of British Chambers of Commerce from 1923 to 1924 and of the British Council from 1947 to 1950 and as Chairman of the Advisory Council for Scientific and Industrial Research from 1937 to 1957. He chaired the Committee on Industry and Trade from 1924 to 1928.

In 1935 he was appointed as the chairman of the Departmental Committee on Fire Brigade Services, which became known as the Riverdale Committee. The committee's report resulted in the Fire Brigades Act 1938.

Balfour married Frances Josephine Bingham, daughter of Charles Henry Bingham, in 1899. He died in July 1957, aged 84, and was succeeded in his titles by his eldest son Robert. Lady Riverdale died in 1960. He was a freemason and founding member of University Lodge Sheffield 3911.

Honours and styles
He was appointed a Knight Commander of the Order of the British Empire in 1923, created a Baronet of Sheffield in the County of York in 1929, and raised to the peerage as Baron Riverdale, of Sheffield in the County of York, on 27 June 1935. On 11 June 1942 he was even further honoured when he was appointed a Knight Grand Cross of the Order of the British Empire for services to the Empire Air Training Scheme.

On 2 March 1943, he was made an honorary air commodore of the Auxiliary Air Force, serving in the No. 601 Squadron RAF.

References

 

1873 births
1957 deaths
Barons in the Peerage of the United Kingdom
People educated at Ashville College
Knights Grand Cross of the Order of the British Empire
Arthur
Master Cutlers
Barons created by George V